Purosangue may refer to:

 Purosangue Orientale, an Italian horse breed
 Ferrari Purosangue, an Italian sports SUV